Coal Lick Run is a small tributary to South Fork Tenmile Creek in southwestern Pennsylvania.  The stream rises in northeastern Greene and flows north entering South Fork Tenmile Creek east of Morrisville, Pennsylvania near the Greene County Airport. The watershed is roughly 30% agricultural, 53% forested and the rest is other uses.

References

Rivers of Pennsylvania
Tributaries of the Monongahela River
Rivers of Greene County, Pennsylvania